FK Borec is a football club from Veles, North Macedonia. They currently play in the Macedonian Second  League.

History
The club was founded in 1919.

FK Borec played in the Macedonian First League from the 1992–93 through the 1994–95 season.

The club was promoted to the First League again following the 1996–97 season.

It has produced many players, among the best are: Zoran Paunov, Ilčo Borov, Panche Stoilov and Panche Kjumbev.

Supporters
The supporters group Gemidžii is named after the anarchistic group who have committed the bombings in Thessaloniki on 1903. Earlier, the fans were known as Vampiri (Vampires).

Honours

 Macedonian Republic League:
Winners (1): 1989

 Macedonian Second League:
Winners (2): 1996–97, 2018–19
Runners-up (2): 1995–96, 2017–18

Recent seasons

1The 2019–20 season was abandoned due to the COVID-19 pandemic in North Macedonia.

Current squad

References

External links
Borec Veles Facebook 
Club info at MacedonianFootball 
Football Federation of Macedonia 

 
Football clubs in North Macedonia
Association football clubs established in 1919
1919 establishments in Yugoslavia